Hubert Hurkacz was the defending champion but chose not to defend his title.

Ugo Humbert won the title after defeating Evgeny Donskoy 6–2, 6–3 in the final.

Seeds
All seeds receive a bye into the second round.

Draw

Finals

Top half

Section 1

Section 2

Bottom half

Section 3

Section 4

References

External links
Main draw
Qualifying draw

2019 ATP Challenger Tour